Pochvovedenie is a Russian journal of soil science. The first issue was published in 1899. 

The English translation is called. Eurasian Soil Science. The journal headquarters is in Moscow.

Bibliography
Editorial Board. 2009. 110 years to the journal Pochvovedenie. Eurasian Soil Science 42 (1) 1–3.

References

Agricultural soil science
Soil and crop science organizations
1899 establishments in the Russian Empire
Magazines established in 1899
Science and technology magazines published in Russia
Russian-language magazines
Agricultural magazines
Soil science journals
Magazines published in Moscow

ru:Почвоведение